The Toyota E engine family is a straight-four piston engine series, and uses timing belts rather than chains. The E engines were the first multi-valve engines from Toyota designed with economy, practicality and everyday use in mind (rather than performance). Like many other Toyota engines from the era, the E engine series features a cast iron block, along with an aluminium cylinder head. E engines are lighter than earlier Toyota engines, due to the hollow crankshaft, thinned casting of the cylinder block, and several other reductions in auxiliaries as well as in the engine itself. Carbureted versions include a newly designed, variable-venturi carburetor. All of these changes improved economy and emissions. The members of the E engine family, range from 1.0 L to 1.5 L. The E family supplanted the K engines in most applications. A large number of parts in the E engine series are interchangeable between each other.

1E
The 1E is a  carbureted 12-valve SOHC engine. Compression ratio is 9.0:1. It appeared in 1985.

Specs
  Bore x stroke: 
  Displacement: 
  Valve clearance: Intake: ;  Exhaust: 
  Ignition timing (with vacuum advancer off): 10 degrees BTDC
  Oil capacity: 

Gearbox 
  4-speed manual gearbox: C140
  Automatic transmission: ***

Applications
 Toyota Starlet#P70 EP70, EP80.

2E

The 2E is a  SOHC version with three valves per cylinder. It appeared in 1985, and was discontinued after 1998. The 2E engines appeared in both carbureted and fuel-injected (called 2E-E) versions. The 2E-TE, appearing in 1986, is a turbocharged engine producing . A later version, the 2E-TELU produces .

Specs
 Bore x stroke: 
 Displacement: 
 Compression ratio: 9.5:1
 Ignition timing (with vacuum advancer off): 10 degrees BTDC
 Ignition timing (as per Haynes Databook): 5 degrees BTDC at 800 rpm

Gearbox 
4-speed and 5-speed manual gearbox: C40, C150, C152 (turbo model)
Automatic transmission: A132

Applications
 AE92, AE111 Toyota Corolla (South Africa)
 Toyota Corolla/Toyota Sprinter EE80, EE90, EE96V, EE97G, EE100, EE110 (Philippines and Vietnam)
 Toyota Starlet EP71, EP81, EP82 (2E-E,Si Version), EP90
 Toyota Starlet EP76V Van (2E-LJ) -  at 6,000 rpm,  at 4,000 rpm
 Toyota Corsa
 Toyota Conquest (South Africa)
 Toyota Tazz (South Africa)
 Toyota Tercel (Caribbean/South America/Middle East)

3E
The 3E is a  SOHC version with three valves per cylinder. It appeared in 1986, and was discontinued after 1994. The 3E engines appeared in both carbureted (3E) and fuel-injected (3E-E) applications.

Specs
 Bore x stroke 
 9.3:1 compression ratio (8.0:1 3E-TE)

Applications
 Toyota Corolla/Sprinter EE98V (van)
 Toyota Corolla/Sprinter EE107V/EE108G (van/wagon)
 Toyota Corona ET176V (van)
 Toyota Tercel/Corolla II/Corsa EL31

The 3E and 3E-E engines are considered slightly less reliable than other Toyota engines, although they are also among the easiest engines to service. The most common problems affecting these engines are premature valve stem seal (nitrile rubber) failure, carbon buildup on the intake valves, and collapse of the oil control ring on the piston.  Any of these conditions can lead to rough idling, stalling, and fouled spark plugs, and therefore need to be differentially diagnosed. The valve stem seals, at least, can be replaced with silicone or Viton-based seals which last much longer.

4E
The 4E is a  DOHC version. It appeared in 1989, and was discontinued after 1998. The 4E engines appeared in fuel-injected applications.

Applications
 Toyota Starlet EP82, EP85, EP91, EP95
 Toyota Tercel
 Toyota Corolla
 Toyota Paseo
 Toyota Cynos

First generation 4E-FE
The first generation of 4E engines found in the Starlet GI, Soleil and Corolla models were produced from 1989 until 1996. This engine has more in common with the 4E-FTE, sharing the same throttle body, and slightly larger fuel injectors.

Specs
 Bore x stroke 
 9.6:1 compression ratio

Second generation 4E-FE
The second generation of the 4E-FE was introduced in 1996 producing less peak power:  at 5,500 rpm, but with a slight increase in peak torque  at 4,400 rpm. The second generation of the 4E-FE is essentially the same engine as the first but the intake and exhaust manifolds were changed along with a slight alteration of the ECU meant to reduce exhaust emissions.

Specs
 Bore x stroke 
 9.6:1 compression ratio

Third generation 4E-FE
This engine was discontinued in 1999.

4E-FTE
The 4E-FTE is the most powerful of the E series engines ever produced. It was produced exclusively for the Toyota Starlet GT Turbo (Japan Only) and its successor, the Toyota Glanza V (Japan only). However the 4E-FTE was a very popular conversion engine by enthusiasts for many small Toyota cars such as the Corolla, Tercel, Paseo and Sera which it fit into with standard Toyota parts. The 4E-FTE differs internally from the 4E-FE with its stronger connecting rods, lower compression pistons (reduced from 9.6:1 to 8.5:1) and stronger crankshaft. The cylinder head is identical with the valve train featuring higher lift on the inlet camshaft, and stronger valve springs to the 4E-FE. The 4E-FTE also features a harmonic damper instead of a normal crankshaft pulley. The turbocharger fitted to the 4E-FTE was Toyota's own CT9 model, which features an internal waste gate and has two modes: low  and high  boost. The low boost mode is electronically controlled by a solenoid valve and the ECU and the high boost is controlled by an actuator connected to the turbocharger. The 4E-FTE also has a top-mounted, air-cooled intercooler. The 4E-FTE is mated to the Toyota C52 transmission (for the EP82 Starlet GT) and the C56 transmission (for the EP91 Glanza V).

Specs
 Bore x stroke 
 8.5:1 compression ratio

5E
The 5E is a  DOHC 16-valve version. It was introduced in 1990 and discontinued in 1998. All 5E engines are fuel-injected. In 1995 Toyota changed the ignition system to a distributor-less (DIS), coil-on-plug design, switched from OBD to OBD-II and began using flat topped pistons. This ignition design uses two coils. Each coil mounts on top of a spark plug, but also has a cable run to another cylinder's spark plug. This is known as a "wasted spark design". It is electrically similar to engines that have a coil pack. The spark plug fires in both directions (center-to-side, and side-to-center). Double platinum plugs are used with this engine to prevent premature side electrode wear. A much thinner  head gasket is used to increase compression after the piston domes were removed, and dual electrode spark plugs were installed on California emission models. In 1996 the connecting rods changed to the same thinner ones similar to those used in the second generation 4E-FE. In 1997 a return-less fuel system was added.
The crankshaft is cast and interestingly has 3E markings. 

Specs
 Bore x stroke 
 9.4:1 compression ratio

Applications
 Toyota Paseo
 Toyota Sera
 Toyota Tercel
 Toyota Raum
 Toyota Corolla
 Toyota Corsa
 Toyota Caldina
 Toyota Corolla II
 Toyota Cynos
 Toyota Vios

5E-FHE
The maximum engine speed was increased to 7,200 rpm in the first generation, and 7,900 for the second generation. It uses the harmonic damper from the 4E-FTE, and slightly more aggressive higher lift cams (approximately 8.2mm inlet side, and 7.7mm exhaust side), high compression pistons (although they have a lower dome than 4E-FE pistons), cast 4-2-1 exhaust headers, and stronger internals (including the thicker connecting rods as found in the first generation 5E-FE which are factory forged, and a stronger factory forged crankshaft which has 5E markings).

Some versions of the 5E-FHE (but not for the Sera) are fitted with the ACIS intake manifold which is claimed to increase the power to 130 PS (96 kW; 128 hp).

See also

 List of Toyota engines

References

E
Straight-four engines
Gasoline engines by model